Elizabeth Nicole Abrams, better known as Liz (stylized as LIZ) or Liz Y2K, is an American singer and actress from Tarzana, Los Angeles, California. Her music is described by herself as "Sailor Moon R&B" and "future pop". and her music has been continuously stated to be "unapologetically pop" sounding.

Liz gained more attention in 2015 when she released a single, made with producer Sophie, called "When I Rule the World" which first appeared in a Samsung commercial.

She is additionally recognized for her late 1990s/early 2000s influence which is prevalent in both her music and fashion. The "Y2K" in her social media handles is in reference to this.

Early life and career
Liz was born in Los Angeles to Jewish parents, and grew up working in the arts. For 13 years of her childhood, she was a ballerina and danced with The Joffrey Ballet of Chicago for a period of time. In addition to dancing and music, she also has a background in acting and has had several cameos in TV shows, co-starred in feature-length films, and has appeared in commercials throughout her artistic career.

She has stated that she has wanted to be a musician since she was little and began to sing around seven years old. She started working with writers and producers when she was 13 years old after she auditioned for the girl group No Secrets which she did not make.

Throughout her teens and early twenties, Liz performed acoustically at small venues in Los Angeles with her keyboard and would sell CDs at her shows.

Musical career

2013–present
Liz is Mad Decent's first pop artist and the first woman signed to the label. Before signing with Mad Decent, Liz was writing for and working with many different DJs and studios in the EDM community. It was through this community that she was introduced to Diplo who later signed her to his label in 2013.

Throughout 2013, Liz released two EPs and a total of eight songs which included collaborating with producers such as The Picard Brothers, Djemba Djemba, Ryan Hemsworth, and Kevin Seaton. She also released the music videos for "Hush" and "U Over Them" during this year. The website Kick Kick Snare named Liz as their favorite solo artist of 2013 and stated that her melodies "bend, twist, and weave around the nostalgic backing tracks in just the right way" and that she was "90's influenced, but forward thinking". In addition to this, Charli XCX asked her to open for her True Romance U.S. Tour alongside KITTEN. It was during this tour that Liz sold her Tour CD.

In 2014, Liz released her seven track EP Just Like You which she made available to download for free through her SoundCloud. She also collaborated with Pharrell Williams for the song "That's My Man," which appeared on The Amazing Spider-Man 2 soundtrack. The music video for this song was released the same year as well as her music video for "All Them Boys."

Liz had met and collaborated with producer Sophie for the song "When I Rule the World" in 2014 but it was not released until 2015. It first appeared in a Samsung commercial and then later appeared in an episode of MTV's Scream. Shortly following the song's release was its music video which gained a lot of attention for its over-the-top glossy and early 2000s aesthetic and hyperpop sound. The song made both The Guardian's and The Idolator's list for "one of the best songs of 2015."

During October 2016, Liz released her mixtape, Cross Your Heart, which she made available to stream through her SoundCloud. It was a 33-minute, one-track file consisting of 16 different songs made with producers such as Henrik the Artist, Lido, Mess Kid, King Henry, and Valentino Khan. To complement the mixtape, Liz teamed up with Nicopanda to create a five-part fashion editorial. During the shoot, Liz had to continuously put glycerine on her face to achieve the "plastic" look seen in the photos. The mixtape received a lot of positive press which included Noisey calling it "one of 2016's most forward-thinking pop releases."

Liz has stated that being influential and being a "tastemaker" is important to her and her musical career. She places high value on being able to progress with music and pop culture and does not follow music trends without fully understanding the source of that music's origin.

On November 15, 2019, Liz released her first full-length studio album Planet Y2K under Moving Castle with the singles "Diamond in the Dark", "BTR 2GTHR", "Lottery", "Laguna Nights", and "Intuition".

Style and influences

Musical
Liz has stated that she felt she made more original sounding music when she went back and studied the artists that influenced her growing up, such as Jimmy Jam and Terry Lewis, Max Martin, NSYNC, Aaliyah, Ashanti, Mýa and Craig David. She says those sounds had a big impact on her and helped her figure out who she was as an artist and as a person. Other artists that influenced her are Britney Spears, Janet Jackson, Gwen Stefani, Kylie Minogue, Madonna, Robyn, Christina Aguilera, and Mariah Carey. Additionally, Liz says that Spears taught her "how to be a pop star".

Japanese culture has been stated to have an effect on her music as well. She likes to explore the idea of innocence in her work, which she feels is present in a lot of Japanese music. Her music can also be tongue-in-cheek at times, and she enjoys taking on a different character for each of her songs.

Fashion
Liz can often be found wearing big jerseys, pastel colored tracksuits, and vintage pieces that she finds in swap meets. She enjoys clothing that feels nostalgic to her and takes influence from her childhood and the 1990s/early 2000s aesthetic.

She states comfort as a priority in her fashion choices and wears a lot of oversized clothing. She also often mixes tomboy pieces with girly pieces.

Liz believes music and fashion go hand in hand and she is inspired by designers and creative directors with how they "help create iconic moments in pop culture."

Tours
Mad Decent Block Party (2014)

Supporting
Charli XCX True Romance U.S. Headlining Tour (2013)

Discography

Albums

Studio albums

Mixtapes

Demo albums

EPs

Singles

As lead artist

As featured artist

Guest appearances

Music videos

Awards and nominations

References

External links
 
 

21st-century American singers
People from Tarzana, Los Angeles
Singers from Los Angeles
Living people
1987 births
Mad Decent artists
Jewish American musicians
21st-century American women singers
Monstercat artists
Art pop singers